Jonathan Byrne Ollivier (26 April 1977 – 9 August 2015) was a British dancer.

Biography
Born in Northampton, he began his dance journey at The Fairweather School of Dancing before completing his study of both classical ballet and contemporary at the Rambert Ballet School. After graduating in 1996, he joined CAPAB (since renamed the Cape Town City Ballet). He became a principal before returning to England in 1999 to join Northern Ballet Theatre (now Northern Ballet) as Principal. Before leaving he married South African principal ballerina Desiré Samaai in Paarl, Cape Town. Ollivier joined the Alberta Ballet Company as a Principal dancer in 2007. Ollivier was a strong partner, fine actor and a dancer of extraordinary physical and emotional intensity.

Notable roles
 The Swan/The Stranger in Matthew Bourne's Swan Lake
 Stanley in A Streetcar Named Desire
 Dracula in Dracula
 Athos in The Three Musketeers
 Heathcliff in Wuthering Heights
 Death in Requiem
 Hyde in Jekyll and Hyde

Awards
 Nominated as Outstanding Young Male Artist in National Dance Awards, 2002
 Nominated as Best Male Dancer in National Dance Awards, 2003–2004
 Honorary Fellowship from the University of Northampton, 2006

Death
Ollivier died on 9 August 2015 in a motorbike accident hours before he was due to perform on stage. On 11 April 2017, the car driver involved in the accident was cleared of causing death by careless driving.

A special performance - Mr Wonderful: A Celebration of Jonathan Ollivier's Life in Dance - was staged at Sadler's Wells in honour of Ollivier on 18 January 2016. The performance included extracts from The Car Man, Matthew Bourne's Swan Lake and Sleeping Beauty. 
New Adventures principal dancers Richard Winsor, Sam Archer, Simon Williams and James Leece performed in Matthew Bourne's Mr Wonderful. The sold-out evening was hosted by Sir Matthew Bourne and featured over 80 performers - including many former colleagues of Ollivier. Income from the event was placed in charitable trust funds for Ollivier's two young sons.

References

External links
 Ballet magazine
 Top British dancer for Carmen

1977 births
2015 deaths
British male ballet dancers
Northern Ballet dancers
Road incident deaths in London
Motorcycle road incident deaths
Musicians from Northamptonshire
People from Northampton